NADH-CoQ reductase may be:
 NADH dehydrogenase, an enzyme
 NADH:ubiquinone reductase (non-electrogenic), an enzyme